Choptank, also known as the J. Clayton Farm, is a historic home located near Middletown, New Castle County, Delaware.  It was built about 1850, and is a three-story, five-by-two bay, timber-frame structure on a brick foundation.  It has a low-hipped roof.  Also on the property are a contributing large barn, corn crib, and shed.

It was listed on the National Register of Historic Places in 1985.

References

Houses on the National Register of Historic Places in Delaware
Houses completed in 1850
Houses in New Castle County, Delaware
National Register of Historic Places in New Castle County, Delaware